The Institute of Boiler and Radiator Manufacturers (IBR, I=B=R), in the United States, is currently incorporated into the Gas Appliance Manufacturers Association (GAMA).  The merger of GAMA and IBR occurred on April 18, 2004.  Under the IBR name, GAMA continues to offer regular classes on hydronic heat installation in the Northeastern United States.  The IBR is a nationally recognized boiler and radiator certification organization.  The IBR was formerly also known as the Hydronics Institute.

References

Trade associations based in the United States